Mikhail Novikov may refer to:

 Mikhail Novikov (biathlon coach), coached Svetlana Sleptsova
 Mikhail Mikhailovich Novikov, rector of the Moscow State University from 1919 to 1920